Plateaux is a department of the Republic of the Congo in the central part of the country. It borders the departments of Cuvette, Lékoumou, and Pool, and internationally, the Democratic Republic of the Congo on the east and Gabon on the west. The regional capital is Djambala.  Principal cities and towns include Gamboma and Lekana.

Administrative divisions 
Plateaux Department is divided into eleven districts:

Districts 
 Djambala District
 Lekana District
 Gamboma District
 Abala District
 Allembé District
 Makotimpoko District
 Mbon District
 Mpouya District
 Ngo District
 Ollombo District
 Ongogni District

References

Republic of the Congo at GeoHive

 
Departments of the Republic of the Congo